Yaycı is a köy (village) in the Iğdır Central District of, Iğdır Province, Turkey.

History 
The village is one of the 21 Muslim villages around Iğdır, which Armenian gangs raided and killed the men and raped the women in August 1919. On September 17th 1920, again a part of the village was murdered.

Demographics 
As of the 2019, there were 823 people living in the village. The population of the village is Azerbaijani.

Geography 
The village lies on a  distance by road of the district capital of Iğdır.

References

Villages in Iğdır Province

Iğdır Central District
Towns in Turkey
Populated places in Iğdır Province